WLSF (88.3 MHz) is a Christian contemporary station licensed to Starke, Florida. It is owned by Educational Media Foundation and is an affiliate of K-Love.

History
The station began broadcasting in 1982, and held the call sign WTLG. It was owned by Starke Christian Education Radio & TV and aired a southern gospel format. In 2008, the station was sold to American Family Association for $225,000, and it became an affiliate of American Family Radio.

In 2014, American Family Association traded WTLG and KNDW in Williston, North Dakota to Educational Media Foundation, in exchange for WVDA in Valdosta, Georgia. WTLG became an affiliate of K-Love. On December 15, 2014, the station's call sign was changed to WCKL-FM. On March 12, 2018, its call sign was briefly changed to WLUP-FM, after swapping call signs with 97.9 in Chicago. On March 19, 2018, its call sign was changed to WLSF.

References

External links

K-Love radio stations
Radio stations established in 1982
1982 establishments in Florida
Educational Media Foundation radio stations
LSF